Giovanni Marchetti (Empoli, 10 April 1753 – Empoli, 15 November 1829) was a Roman Catholic archbishop of Italy. He was also Roman Catholic Titular Archbishop of Ancyra.

Biography
Giovanni Marchetti was born in Empoli in 1753, the first son of Giuseppe and Dorotea Brandi. His mother died a few years later, in 1759, at the birth of the last of her daughters, Maria Giovanna; Even his father disappeared soon, in 1767. John therefore had to attend only the three younger sisters alone. Despite the economic difficulties, he succeeded in completing his legal studies and obtaining a modest seat in the Empolese tribunal. In 1773 he finally went to Rome, where to host him was a well-known missionary in his hometown that convinced him to devote himself to ecclesiastical career. He also gained the protection of Cardinal Ludwig Maria Torriggiani (1697–1777), who was able to become a student of "philosophical disciplines and sacred sciences" at the Collegio Romano. He was ordained a priest on 20 December 1777 and graduated in theology on 12 September the following year.

Meanwhile, Marchetti had become an assiduous guest of Pope Pius VI and, at Torriggiani's death, he was housed as secretary at the court of Giuseppe Mattei, Duke of di Giove (who was at that time the head of the horse-riding body of the Pontifical State).

His will donated his works to establish a library of his writings.

References

1753 births
1829 deaths
People from Empoli
18th-century Italian Roman Catholic titular archbishops
19th-century Italian Roman Catholic titular archbishops